Sentimental Ward is the fifth studio album by San Pedro-based punk band Toys That Kill, released on July 1, 2016 on Recess Records. An album release show was held at The Echo in Los Angeles.

Track listing
S.D.R.T.T.Go!
The Safe Song
New Recruits
The Constant Belly Up
Form Your Fiend
Sentimental Ward
Silent War
Four String
War On Words
Soap
Flypaper to Psycho
Ready To Fall
Hidden Track
Times We Can't Let Go
Melt The Ice
Lazy

Personnel
Todd Congelliere – Vocals, Guitar
Sean Cole – Vocals, Guitar
Jimmy Felix – Drums
Chachi Ferrera – Bass, Vocals

Reception
Ty Stranglehold of Razorcake declared of the album "It makes the hairs on the back of my neck stand up when I listen to it. I can’t stop listening to it."

References

2016 albums